Luo Qianqian (）is a Chinese woman who lived in the US now and spoke out in 2017 to denounce the sexual harassment her previous professor Chen Xiaowu（）in Beihang University has done to her 13 years ago. She has gained great attention on the internet and many people support her to fight the injustice in the university. She also encourages other victims of sexual harassment in China to speak of their experience and use the hashtag #我也是 (woyeshi) which means "me too" in English.

Sexual harassment by Chen Xiaowu 
Luo Qianqian was a Ph.D. student studying at Beihang University at the end of 2004. Her professor Chen Xiaowu sexually harassed her in his sister's vacant apartment. Chen locked the door of the apartment and started to harass Luo. Luo cried that she was a virgin. Then Chen stops it and demands her not to tell anyone what has happened that day. Chen also told her that he was only testing her moral standard, yet Luo was frightened by this incident.

After what had happened, Luo's Ph.D. years become very difficult, yet she never tells the incident to anyone else since Chen told her so. She was depressed and chose to study abroad as soon as possible due to her fear of facing Chen again.

Report of the sexual harassment 
Living in the US, Luo herself was inspired by the Me Too movement that happened in Hollywood in October. Then she saw an answer in Zhihu, a Chinese question-and-answer site, which mentioned Chen's improper behaviour as a professor who assaulted his students sexually. Luo realized that she was not the only one who has suffered in silence from Chen's sexual harassment.  Luo felt the need to act when she knew that Chen Xiaowu has made a student pregnant.  She then started another answer detailing how she was also harassed by Chen Xiaowu when she was a student in Beihang University.

In October 2017, Luo finally reported Chen Xiaowu. She made a public post about her story twelve years ago. She has received great attention on Chinese social media immediately, and five other students stand out to support Luo and accuse Chen of sexual harassment. Luo also contacted other students who have been sexually assaulted by Chen and collects evidence such as audio recordings before sending it to the university.

Based on Beijing Youth Daily's report, Chen declared that his behaviour is not illegal, and this event might harm his reputation. He asked people to wait for more information and the outcome of the university's investigation. Beihang University also informed the public on their official Weibo website that they were going to investigate Chen. After the investigation, Beihang University decided to dismiss Chen as a professor and the vice president of the university's graduate program. Chen's academic title as "Yangtze River Scholar" has also been removed by the Ministry of Education.

Influence 
Seven out of ten university students have experienced sexual harassment based on a research in March by the Guangzhou Gender and Sexuality Education Centre. 75 percent of the victims are women. Nevertheless, a large number of the cases remain unreported. A student from Beihang University also states that there is no effective system to protect victims and handle their cases in Chinese schools. For the victims of sexual harassment in Chinese universities, the only way left to get the perpetrator punished is to ask for media attention on the internet.

On 1 January, Luo called online that people should take action instead of staying silent on their place. She declared that there is nothing to be afraid of and people should speak out of the current condition. She encourages people to use the hashtag #我也是 （Woyeshi）, which means "me too" in Chinese. As a consequence, many Chinese university students and alumni petitioned online that universities should establish an official policy on the matter of sexual harassment. Similar to the #Metoo hashtag, they also use a hashtag called #Everyonein since they feel it is not enough to only include the ones who have experienced sexual harassment. People who are not victims should also support them and fight for justice in society,

On the Chinese internet, people also paid a lot of attention to this incident that happened to Luo. A student from Beihang University also complained that the current system did not provide much help for the victims of sexual violence or sexual harassment. Society discouraged victims to speak up since the environment is not safe. The posts on the internet could be deleted easily and the victims also face many threats when they fight for their justice.

References 

Sexual harassment
Beihang University alumni
Year of birth missing (living people)
Living people
Place of birth missing (living people)